Antonio García Conejo (born 5 September 1971) is a Mexican politician affiliated with the PRD who will serve as a senator from the state of Michoacán in the LXIV Legislature of the Mexican Congress. He was also a federal deputy in the LXII Legislature as well as a local deputy in the Congress of Michoacán.

García Conejo is the half brother of Governor Silvano Aureoles Conejo.

References

1971 births
Living people
Politicians from Michoacán
Members of the Chamber of Deputies (Mexico) for Michoacán
Party of the Democratic Revolution politicians
21st-century Mexican politicians
Universidad Michoacana de San Nicolás de Hidalgo alumni
Members of the Congress of Michoacán
Members of the Senate of the Republic (Mexico) for Michoacán
Deputies of the LXII Legislature of Mexico
Senators of the LXIV and LXV Legislatures of Mexico